Port Reading Refinery, also known as Hess Refinery (photo), was an oil refinery located in Perth Amboy and Port Reading, New Jersey. It was constructed by Hess Oil under Leon Hess in 1958. It is a simple refinery which further processes other refinery's product which begins with heavy sour crude. It is owned by the Hess Corporation, refiners of Hess brand gasoline. The refinery itself has outlets that connect with Arthur Kill, enabling oil barges to make passage into the refinery's commons. The refinery had a neon red "HESS" sign on its cracking unit which was removed in December, 2013 after the property was sold. The refinery was closed in 2013.

See also
Bayway Refinery

Perth Amboy Refinery
Chemical Coast
Port of Paulsboro

References

External links
Hess: Operations

Energy infrastructure completed in 1958
Oil refineries in the United States
Energy infrastructure in New Jersey
Buildings and structures in Middlesex County, New Jersey
Woodbridge Township, New Jersey
1958 establishments in New Jersey
2013 disestablishments in New Jersey